Harry Smith (born 1885) was a footballer who played in the Football League for Stoke and Walsall.

Career
Smith was born in Cannock and played for Walsall before joining Stoke in 1907. He played in his one and only Football League match on 14 March 1908 at home to West Bromwich Albion in a 1–1 draw. He didn't play for the club again and re-joined Walsall.

Career statistics

References

English footballers
Stoke City F.C. players
Walsall F.C. players
English Football League players
People from Cannock
1885 births
Year of death missing
Association football defenders